The 2016 Central Michigan Chippewas football team represented Central Michigan University in the 2016 NCAA Division I FBS football season. They were led by second-year head coach John Bonamego and played their home games at Kelly/Shorts Stadium as members of the West Division of the Mid-American Conference. They finished the season 6–7, 3–5 to finish in fifth place in the MAC West. They received an invitation to the Miami Beach Bowl where they were blown out by Tulsa 55–10.

Schedule

Schedule Source:

Game summaries

Presbyterian

at Oklahoma State

This game sparked controversy after the officials missed a call that would eventually give Central Michigan the win. Oklahoma State threw the ball away to end the game and received a penalty for intentional grounding. Under college football rules, the game would have ended and Oklahoma State would have won the game. However, the officials gave Central Michigan an untimed down, and the Chippewas threw a 51-yard hail mary and scored after completing the pass and a lateral.

UNLV

at Virginia

Western Michigan

Ball State

at Northern Illinois

at Toledo

Kent State

at Miami (OH)

Ohio

at Eastern Michigan

Tulsa–Miami Beach Bowl

References

Central Michigan
Central Michigan Chippewas football seasons
Central Michigan Chippewas football